Sérgio Soares da Silva (born 11 January 1967) is a Brazilian football manager and former player who played as a midfielder.

Playing career
Born in São Paulo, Soares began his career with hometown side Juventus, making his first team debut in 1985 and being sold to Al-Hilal of Saudi Arabia in 1993. In 1996, after a short period at Guarani, he joined Palmeiras.

A backup option at Verdão, Soares was loaned to Japanese club Kyoto Purple Sanga for the remainder of the 1996 season. After featuring more sparingly in 1997, he still left the club and moved to Goiás, where he featured very rarely before returning to his first club Juventus.

Soares subsequently played for Inter de Limeira, Juventus (two stints), Etti Jundiai, São José-SP, Gama, Santo André (three stints) and Náutico. He retired in 2004 with Santo André, aged 37.

Managerial career
Shortly after retiring, Soares was named assistant manager and supervisor at his last club Santo André. On 25 July 2004, he was named manager of the first team after Péricles Chamusca left.

Soares returned to his assistant role after the appointment of Luiz Carlos Ferreira for the 2005 season, but was again named manager on 14 March 2005, after Ferreira resigned. He left in December to return to his first club Juventus, now as manager.

On 26 January 2007, Soares replaced Marcelo Vilar at the helm of Grêmio Barueri, but was sacked on 8 April. He returned to Santo André on 17 May, but was dismissed on 1 November with the club struggling with relegation in the Série B.

On 21 January 2008, Soares returned to Juventus. He resigned on 29 February, and subsequently rejoined Santo André for a fourth period as manager on 16 May. He led the latter side to a top tier promotion before opting to join Ponte Preta on 4 December.

Soares left Ponte on 9 March 2009, and took over São Caetano three days later. He was sacked on 1 June, and was named in charge of Paraná five days later; he resigned on 7 September, and returned to Santo André the following day.

Soares led Santo André to the second position of the 2010 Campeonato Paulista, but resigned on 22 September after the club was in the relegation zone. On 4 October, he was named Atlético Paranaense manager, but was sacked on 3 February 2011.

Soares returned to Barueri on 11 May 2011, but was sacked on 1 August. On 6 January, he had his first managerial experience abroad after being named in charge of Japanese club Cerezo Osaka, but was relieved of his duties on 27 August and subsequently replaced by compatriot Levir Culpi.

On 6 December 2012, Soares replaced Argel Fuchs at the helm of Avaí. Sacked the following 10 March, he was named in charge of Ceará on 18 August 2013, in the place of Sérgio Guedes.

Soares resigned from Ceará on 22 October 2014, and was appointed Bahia manager on 22 December. On 6 October of the following year, after five winless matches, he was sacked, and took over São Bernardo on 26 February 2016.

Soares was announced back at Ceará on 4 April 2016, with the move being effective seven days later. On 14 November, it was announced that his contract would not be renewed, and he returned to Santo André on 28 February 2017.

On 3 April 2017, Soares agreed to become the manager of another club he represented as a player, Goiás, but was sacked on 27 May after four winless matches. He returned to Santo André for the 2018 Campeonato Paulista on 11 October 2017, and left after the competition ended.

On 29 June 2018, Soares took over Londrina also in the second level, but was dismissed on 4 August. On 11 February 2019, he returned to São Bernardo, and later moved to ABC on 15 May.

Sacked by ABC on 9 June 2019, and was appointed in charge of Ferroviária the following 17 January. He was dismissed by the latter on 27 March 2020, and returned to Juventus on 4 January 2021.

Soares was dismissed by Juventus on 4 May 2021, and was named manager of neighbouring Portuguesa for the 2022 campaign on 11 November. He won the 2022 Campeonato Paulista Série A2 with the club, before departing on 4 October of that year.

Career statistics

Managerial statistics

Titles

Player
 Al-Hilal
 UAFA Club Cup: 1994, 1995

Palmeiras
 Campeonato Paulista: 1996

Santo André
 Copa Paulista: 2003
 Copa do Brasil: 2004

Manager
 Grêmio Barueri
 Campeonato Paulista Série A2: 2006

 Santo André
 Campeonato Paulista Série A2: 2008

 Ceará
 Campeonato Cearense: 2014

 Bahia
 Campeonato Baiano: 2015

 Portuguesa
 Campeonato Paulista Série A2: 2022

References

External links
 
 
 sports.geocities.jp 

1967 births
Living people
Brazilian football managers
Brazilian footballers
Brazilian expatriate footballers
Association football midfielders
Brazilian expatriate football managers
Expatriate footballers in Saudi Arabia
Expatriate footballers in Japan
Expatriate football managers in Japan
Campeonato Brasileiro Série A players
Campeonato Brasileiro Série B players
Saudi Professional League players
J1 League players
Campeonato Brasileiro Série A managers
Campeonato Brasileiro Série B managers
Campeonato Brasileiro Série C managers
J1 League managers
Clube Atlético Juventus players
Al Hilal SFC players
Guarani FC players
Sociedade Esportiva Palmeiras players
Kyoto Sanga FC players
Goiás Esporte Clube players
Associação Atlética Internacional (Limeira) players
Paulista Futebol Clube players
Sociedade Esportiva do Gama players
São José Esporte Clube players
Esporte Clube Santo André players
Clube Náutico Capibaribe players
Esporte Clube Santo André managers
Clube Atlético Juventus managers
Grêmio Barueri Futebol managers
Associação Atlética Ponte Preta managers
Associação Desportiva São Caetano managers
Paraná Clube managers
Club Athletico Paranaense managers
Cerezo Osaka managers
Avaí FC managers
Ceará Sporting Club managers
Esporte Clube Bahia managers
São Bernardo Futebol Clube managers
Goiás Esporte Clube managers
Londrina Esporte Clube managers
ABC Futebol Clube managers
Associação Ferroviária de Esportes managers
Associação Portuguesa de Desportos managers
Footballers from São Paulo